Juan Navarro Baldeweg (11 June 1939, Santander) is a Spanish architect and professor at the Superior Technical School of Architecture of Madrid (ETSAM). He is currently retired from architectural practice.

Baldeweg studied at the San Fernando School of Fine Arts of Madrid, and the School of Architecture of the Technical University of Madrid, where he graduated in 1965. From 1977 to 2014 (year when he retired) he was appointed as teacher of the ETSAM, though for more than 20 years he was hardly ever seen in the school.

Throughout his career Baldeweg won numerous architectural design competitions, including for the Castilla y León Convention Center in Salamanca (1985), Olympic Village Training Pavilion in Barcelona (1988), Congress and Convention Center of Cádiz (1988), Ministry Buildings for the Regional Government of Extremadura in Mérida (1989), Congress Center of Salzburg (1992), Museum for the Salvador Allende Collection in Santiago de Chile (1993), Bibliotheca Hertziana, Max-Planck-Gesellschaft in Rome (1995), Cultural Center in Benidorm (1997), Canal Theatres in Madrid and Museum of Human Evolution in Burgos (2000). In 1990, he received Spain's National Award for Plastic Arts.

Projects
 Castilla y León Convention Center, Salamanca, 1985–92
 National Museum and Research Center of Altamira, Santillana del Mar, Cantabria, 1995–2000
 Martos Mill restoration, Córdoba, 2001–05
 Cultural Centre in Benidorm, Alicante, 1997–2006
 Centre for the Stage Arts - The Canal Theatre, Madrid, 2000
 Kunsthal KAdE library and museum, Amersfoort, Netherlands, 2005–09
 Museum of Human Evolution, Burgos, 2000–11

References

External links

Paintings by Baldeweg at Marlborough Gallery

1939 births
Living people
People from Santander, Spain
Architects from Cantabria
Artists from Cantabria
Spanish architects
20th-century Spanish painters
20th-century Spanish male artists
Spanish male painters
21st-century Spanish painters
Members of the European Academy of Sciences and Arts
21st-century Spanish male artists